Worker–Peasant Alliance was a front of the Communist Party of Portugal (Marxist-Leninist) of Eduíno Gomes. AOC was founded on November 17, 1974 and ran lists in the 1976 elections. AOC mustered 15,578 votes (0.03%).

AOC launched the slogan "Neither Kissinger, Nor Brezhnev. National Independence!" (Nem Kissinger, nem Brejnev, independência nacional!).

References

External links
 "Bukharin on the Worker-Peasant Alliance." Za Leninizm [Moscow, Russia] (1925), pp. 347-51, 353, 367.

1974 establishments in Portugal
Defunct communist parties in Portugal
Political parties established in 1974
Political parties with year of disestablishment missing